Leonardo Augusto Antunes de Souza (born January 9, 1986) is a Brazilian racing driver.

Career

Karting
Leonardo de Souza was born in Curitiba. He began racing karts in 1999 at age 13, where he won three South Brazilian championships in 2001, 2003 and 2004, besides the State championships of Parana and Santa Catarina in 2001 and 2003 respectively.

Formula Renault and Formula Three
In 2005 and 2006 he competed in the Brazilian Formula Renault with his own team, Kemba Racing. In 2007, with the extinction of the series he and the team didn't compete anywhere during the season, only returning to the track in 2008 in the South American Formula 3, where he scored regularly in the last three stages of the championship in Santa Cruz do Sul (RS), Curitiba (PR) and Interlagos (SP) and ending the year in ninth place. In 2009 he and the team saw their first win at their home track in Curitiba, unfortunately the lack of better performances due to mechanical failures hurt their fight in the championship and he could only finish the season again in the ninth place.

For 2010 and 2011 season's he continued to race with his own team in South America Formula 3 and was able to get another 2 wins (at Londrina in 2010 and Rio de Janeiro in 2011) and more podiums finishes, but unfortunately poor reliability meant that again he would finish the championship way behind the main contenders .

During the 2012 season he was in contention for the title until the first race of the last round when he suffered a mechanical problem and didn't finish the race, confirming the title for that year champion Fernando "Kid" Rezende, he dropped to 3rd place overall in the last race, his best championship result in the series standings.

Leonardo missed the beginning of the 2013 season but took two wins and two 2nd places in the last 4 races of the year, he has the distinction of winning the last race of the South America Formula 3 as the series transformed into the new Formula 3 Brasil for the 2014 season, the 2013 and last champion of the series is Felipe Guimaraes.

He wasn't successful during 2014 and 2015 when the series turned into Formula 3 Brasil, claiming only one win in his category and one podium finish in those two season.

Racing record

Career summary

  *Season still in progress.

References

External links
 
 Formula 3 Sudamericana official website
 drivers page in Kemba Racing website
 Interview concerning his stolen equipment at Rio de Janeiro

1986 births
Living people
Brazilian racing drivers
Formula 3 Sudamericana drivers
Brazilian Formula Three Championship drivers
Sportspeople from Curitiba

Brazilian Formula Renault 2.0 drivers